Amerasia is an album by artist Terry Allen, recorded with Caravan, released in 1987 by Fate Records and reissued by Sugar Hill Records.  It is the soundtrack to the 1985 film Amerasia by Wolf-Eckart Buhler. The album's liner notes were written by David Byrne.

Track listing 
All tracks composed by Terry Allen
 "Amerasia"
 "My Country 'Tis of Thee"
 "The Burden"
 "Back Out of the World"
 "Swanlake"***
 "Display Woman/Displaced Man"
 "Lucy's Tiger Den"
 "Nobody's Goin' Home (Friendship Highway)"
 "Metrapab"***
 "Church Walking"
 "Food Stall'
 "Cana"
 "Sawahdi (Christmas Song)"
 "Orphans"***
 "Pataya"***
 "Let Freedom Ring"***

 ***Recorded with Caravan in Bangkok, Thailand

References

1987 albums
Terry Allen (artist) albums
Sugar Hill Records albums